Jeremy T. Runnells is a critic of the Church of Jesus Christ of Latter-day Saints (LDS Church) and author of the book titled A Letter to a CES Director (later renamed CES Letter). Runnells grew up as a seventh-generation member of the LDS Church with pioneer ancestry. He served a mission for the church in New York and graduated from church-owned Brigham Young University. In 2012, he began to experience doubts over his faith. A director of institute of the LDS Church's Church Educational System (CES) asked him to write his concerns, and in response Runnells sent an 84-page letter with his concerns.

After not receiving a response, in April 2013 he posted his letter on the internet. The letter spread throughout the Mormon blogosphere and LDS Church communities, and became one of the most influential sites providing the catalyst for many people leaving the LDS Church and resigning their membership.

CES Letter

Background
According to Runnells, after attending a fireside by Marlin K. Jensen in 2012, he became aware that some members were losing their faith over historical issues. Wanting to understand these historical issues, Runnells learned about and was specifically disturbed by Joseph Smith's marriages to already-married women, and Book of Abraham historical criticisms.  "I began to have these feelings of betrayal. I wasn't the village idiot. I read books—a lot of the approved books. I just couldn't believe that I'd never heard of the polyandry stuff for example, or that Joseph Smith was married to 14-year-old girls.  It just really shocked me."

When his grandfather heard of the doubts Runnells had, he put him in contact with a CES institute director, who suggested Runnells write a letter with a list of his concerns.

Content
The CES Letter outlines a large list of issues Runnells has with LDS Church beliefs and its historical narrative. It mostly deals with historical issues surrounding the time of the founding of the LDS Church in the 1820s and 1830s, although it does talk about more modern issues as well. This list includes issues surrounding the translation and historicity of the Book of Mormon, Genetics and the Book of Mormon, Joseph Smith's First Vision, the Book of Abraham, Kinderhook plates, polygamy, asserted prophetic abilities, history of prophetic authority, Mormonism and Freemasonry, science and the Bible, church finances, and church academics. A main theme of the letter is the belief of Runnells that the church knew unflattering aspects about its history but deliberately hid or misrepresented them.

Response
According to the Salt Lake Tribune and The Daily Beast, the letter has been influential in the decision of many now-former members of the LDS Church to resign their membership. Numerous responses by LDS Church apologists in blogs, books, and podcasts have been created, including several by FairMormon. Brian Hales of FairMormon suggested that Runnells was lying, and had been deceived by Satan. Runnells posted an extensive rebuttal to FairMormon's response.

No official response from the LDS Church has been released, including from the CES Director to whom Runnells sent his letter; however, Tad R. Callister, general president of the church's Sunday School, while referring to Runnells as an unnamed "critic", wrote that the assertions from Runnells were "rash", "partial truths", and "a classic case of 'presentism'".

The CES Letter, along with a book published by Egyptologist Robert K. Ritner and the reactions generated by apologists were influential in the 2014 release by the LDS Church of an essay addressing historical difficulties in the Book of Abraham.

In 2016, due to the letter's content and public criticisms of the church, his local LDS Church leaders conducted a disciplinary council to determine the membership status of Runnells, but towards the end of the council before a determination had been made, Runnells resigned his membership, exited the church building where the council was being held and stated to a crowd of supporters outside the church, "I have excommunicated the LDS Church ... from my life. ... What errors or mistakes are there in the 'CES Letter' or on my website that I can publicly correct? If there are no errors or mistakes, why am I being punished for seeking and sharing the truth? I have done nothing wrong. I just wanted the truth." Utah news station KUTV pointed to a survey that 57% of LDS Church members were troubled by high profile excommunications like Runnells, including 43% of temple recommend holders.

Writer Jana Riess has argued that the impact of the CES Letter has been overstated, yet important. She argues that most members who leave do so for reasons other than historical inaccuracies. Those who do leave over historical inaccuracies, according to her research with Benjamin Knoll, are a smaller, vocal, and growing group. This is inconsistent with a non-random, unscientific survey conducted by Podcaster John Dehlin indicating that, among self-recruited survey respondents, historical reasons were a factor in 70% of former members' decisions to leave.

In November 2020, FairMormon released a set of 16 videos responding to Runnells, meant to appeal to Millennials and Generation Z. Latter Day Saint scholar Grant Hardy said of the videos, "I have found them belligerent, sarcastic, sophomoric, inaccurate, demeaning and offensive, ... In no way [do they] reflect Christian discipleship." In response to criticism that the videos were mocking Runnells and other disaffected Latter Day Saints, FairMormon chairman John Lynch said, "We are not trying to mock the people who are affected by the 'CES Letter,' ... We are mocking the letter itself and signal to people that this is a deceitful document, not to be taken seriously."  Runnells responded to the videos in a Facebook post, reposting a video calling them a "dishonest smear campaign". In March 2021, FairMormon changed its name to FAIR, and removed the YouTube videos directed at Runnells and the CES Letter. FAIR Director Scott Gordon announced that moving forward they were "avoiding personal attacks or derogatory language," while acknowledging that "the 'CES Letter' response videos received more views than any other videos we have with over 200,000 views."

Other impacts
A Spider-Man comic book was published in 2018 that had a patch drawn on the protagonist that read, "CES Letter". Upon being notified Marvel released a statement saying, "As a policy, Marvel does not permit hidden controversial messages in its artwork" and scrubbed the reference from further artwork. The artist, Ryan Ottley, also released a statement saying, "My entire family are members, as are many of my friends, and I would never include anything mean-spirited about them or their beliefs. The reference was in regards to a subject I am interested in and a personal decision I made in my life. It has nothing to do with the character, the story or Marvel."

In 2018, when Lars Nielsen published confidential documents about the investment fund of the LDS Church, he titled his work, "Letter to an IRS Director" in homage to the "Letter to a CES Director" written by Runnells.  Nielsen said, "I wrote 'Letter to an IRS Director' in the style (and in admiration) of 'Letter to a CES Director' because isolated, questioning Mormons need hours of immersive, binge-worthy, relatable, and rich content when their 'shelves begins to break.'"

References

External links
 CES Letter

21st-century Mormon missionaries
American skeptics
Blogs about Mormons and Mormonism
Brigham Young University alumni
Former Latter Day Saints
Living people
Mormon bloggers
Critics of Mormonism
21st-century American writers
American Mormon missionaries in the United States
Year of birth missing (living people)